Knut Henrik Holtermann Lossius (23 September 1847 – 9 March 1915) was a Norwegian educator and archaeologist.

He was born in 1847 as the son of Morten Lyng Lossius from Lade in Trondhjem, and was named after his maternal grandfather Knud H. Holtermann. He was a descendant of Lorentz Lossius, who migrated to Norway from Göttingen in the 17th century and became the first director of Røros Copper Works.

He served as headmaster of Trondhjem Cathedral School, and served as praeses of the Royal Norwegian Society of Sciences and Letters from 1899 to 1902. Lossius received the Order of St. Olav in 1912.

References

1847 births
1915 deaths
Heads of schools in Norway
Norwegian archaeologists
Royal Norwegian Society of Sciences and Letters
People from Trondheim
Recipients of the St. Olav's Medal